Fred Hellerman (May 13, 1927 – September 1, 2016) was an American folk singer, guitarist, producer, and songwriter. Hellerman was an original member of the seminal American folk group The Weavers, together with Pete Seeger, Lee Hays, and Ronnie Gilbert. He produced the record album Alice's Restaurant (1967) for Arlo Guthrie, played accompaniment guitar on scores of folk albums, and wrote a number of folk and protest songs.

Life and career
Born on May 13, 1927 in Brooklyn, New York to Jewish parents, Hellerman was the youngest of three children. His father, Harry, was an immigrant from Riga, Latvia and mother, Clara (née Robinson), was born in the United States to immigrants from Riga. He received a Bachelor of Arts degree in 1949 at Brooklyn College. In 1948, Hellerman formed the Weavers with Seeger, Ronnie Gilbert, and Lee Hays. Hellerman wrote and co-wrote some of their hits. He also wrote under the aliases Fred Brooks and Bob Hill. Because of his involvement with left-wing groups during the 1930s and 1940s, Hellerman came under suspicion of Communist sympathies during the McCarthy era.

In 1950, Hellerman was named, along with the rest of the Weavers, in the anti-communist tract Red Channels and was placed on the industry blacklist. In February 1952, an FBI informant testified that the Weavers were members of the Communist party. The group, unable to perform on television, radio, or in most music halls, broke up in 1952, but resumed singing in 1955. They continued together until 1963 (with changes in personnel). He also played on Joan Baez's eponymous first album in 1960. The Weavers held several reunion concerts in 1980, shortly before Hays' death, which were documented in the film The Weavers: Wasn't That a Time! (1982).

Hellermen, writing under the name of Fred Brooks, arranged "Green Grow the Lilacs" on Harry Belafonte's 1959 album, Love is a Gentle Thing. The song was based on a traditional song of Irish origin that was widely sung in the US in the 19th century with different lyrics.  Hellerman wrote two original verses and adapted the chorus.

Hellerman married the writer Susan Lardner, the daughter of John Lardner, in 1970. The Hellermans had two children, Caleb and Simeon.

Hellerman was the last surviving original member of the Weavers. He died on September 1, 2016, at his home in Weston, Connecticut, at the age of 89.

See also
 Fran Minkoff

References

External links
 ASCAP (1966) The ASCAP Biographical Dictionary, 3rd ed., p. 324.
 ASCAP (1980) The ASCAP Biographical Dictionary, 4th ed., p. 222

1927 births
2016 deaths
Musicians from Brooklyn
The Weavers members
Folk musicians from New York (state)
American folk singers
Singer-songwriters from New York (state)
Record producers from New York (state)
Jewish American musicians
Jewish folk singers
American people of Latvian-Jewish descent
People from Weston, Connecticut
Guitarists from New York (state)
American male guitarists
American folk guitarists
American male singer-songwriters
American acoustic guitarists
20th-century American guitarists
Brooklyn College alumni
Lafayette High School (New York City) alumni
20th-century American male singers
20th-century American singers
21st-century American Jews
Singer-songwriters from Connecticut